USCGC Venturous (WMEC-625) is a United States Coast Guard medium endurance cutter. The vessel was constructed by the American Shipbuilding Company in Lorain, Ohio in 1967 and commissioned in 1968. The ship has served on both the west and eastern coasts of the United States. The vessel is used for search and rescue, fishery law enforcement, border enforcement and smuggling interdiction along the coasts and in the Caribbean Sea.

Construction and career
The Venturouss motto is Nemo Supra, which means "None Better". Thirteenth of sixteen s, Venturous was built by the American Shipbuilding Company in Lorain, Ohio.  Her keel was laid on May 22, 1967 and she was commissioned on September 12, 1968.  Upon commissioning Venturous set sail for San Diego, California, and arrived November 23, 1968.  Over the next 27 years Venturous changed her homeport several times, finally settling in Astoria, Oregon before being decommissioned at the United States Coast Guard Yard in Baltimore, Maryland on February 11, 1994, to undergo an 18-month Major Maintenance Availability. Upon recommissioning Venturous was reassigned to her present homeport in St. Petersburg, Florida.United States Coast Guard.

Initially designed for search and rescue (SAR) efforts, Venturous participated in and led many SAR missions including the recovery of the abandoned sailboat Jazz Limited off the coast of Mexico, towing the disabled fishing vessel Crusader to San Diego, California, and towing the Moon Spinner to Pelican, Alaska. In 1970, Venturous responded to the sinking of the fuel tanker .  After hours of dewatering and plugging the tanker was towed safely to shore.

From June 1988 to May 1992, Venturous earned three Coast Guard Unit Commendations, excelling in Alaskan patrols, aiding in the  oil spill cleanup and enforcing fisheries laws.  In 1990 alone, Venturous seized four fishing vessels for violating Russian, Canadian, and U.S. fishing laws.  In January 1999 Venturous boarding team discovered  of cocaine aboard the MV Cannes, at the time the tenth largest seizures in U.S. history.  The cutter was awarded the Coast Guard Foundation Award for operational achievements in the fields of drug and migrant interdiction.

Venturous participated in Hurricane Maria relief in the Caribbean. On September 30, 2017, the cutter docked in Vieques, Puerto Rico to deliver fuel and water to the island. She returned to Vieques again on October 7, 2017 where the Venturous crew delivered approximately 30,000 pounds of food and water. In all, the Venturous crew distributed more than 150,000 pounds of aid to five coastal cities in Puerto Rico during the response.

References

External links
Venturous home page

Ships of the United States Coast Guard
Reliance-class cutters
1968 ships
Ships built in Lorain, Ohio
Historic American Engineering Record in Florida